Johannes (or Johann) Lingelbach (1622–1674) was a Dutch Golden Age painter, associated with the second generation of Bambocciate, a group of genre painters working in Rome from 1625–1700.

Biography
Lingelbach was born in Frankfurt, the son of David Lingelbach, a German technician, who in 1637 settled in Amsterdam with his wife and children. In 1638 the father hired and later established a labyrinth in the Jordaan. He furnished it with machines, that could move or play music and depicting biblical or mythological scenes. Lingelbach lived in Paris between 1642 and 1644, before returning to Amsterdam for several years. He moved to Rome in 1650 and lived there for six years before again returning to Amsterdam, where he remained and worked as painter for the rest of his life. Who instructed him is not known, but he may have been a pupil of Philips Wouwerman, as his works show an influence from Wouwerman's landscapes. Around 1662 Lingelbach lived in Reestraat, a small street near Prinsengracht; he became a close friend of Jurriaen Ovens.

Lingelbach's skill in painting genre figures is no less accomplished in his depictions of architectural and natural objects. He was often invited to paint the figures and animals within other artists landscape pieces, such as the Dutch master landscape painter, Meindert Hobbema and Jan van der Heyden. His study of architectural forms came from observing the paintings of another Bamboccianti, Viviano Codazzi, an Architectural Vedutisti, or view painter.

Lingelbach followed the style of the original Bamboccianti, Pieter van Laer, called Il Bamboccio, bringing his own Italianate style into influence of Northern European painters. He is one of the few Dutch painters of the Bamboccianti, whose works are documented in depth, making his influence greater in the progression of the style.<ref>[http://www.artnet.com/library/05/0512/T051203.asp "Lingelbach, Johannes", The Grove Dictionary of Art", 2000]</ref> Some of his works in Rome were once attributed to Pieter van Laer, but are now rightfully claimed to be Lingelbach’s, such as his, Roman Street Scene with Card Players, (National Gallery). These works show the Italian influence of Caravaggio in their realism and refined chiaroscuro effect, also seen in works such as Lingelbach's, Figures before a Locanda, with a View of the Piazza del Popolo, Rome, (Royal Collection).  Lingelbach died in Amsterdam.

Lingelbach’s forms were accomplished in there effects of light and spatial accuracy, but much freer than that of Codazzi.

Selected works

17th century - Bathing Gypsies, Oil on canvas, (Öffentliche Kunstsammlung, Basel)
17th century - A Sea Battle, Oil on canvas, (Private Collection)
1640s - Roman Street Scene with Card Players, Oil on canvas, (National Gallery, London)
1640s - Figures before a Locanda, with a View of the Piazza del Popolo, Rome, Oil on canvas, (Royal Collection, London)
c. 1650 - Battle of Milvian Bridge1650 - The Blacksmith, (Private Collection)
1650 - Self-portrait with Violin, (Zurich)
1651 - Dentist on Horseback, (Rijksmuseum, Amsterdam)
1651 - Peasants Dancing, Oil on canvas, (Metropolitan Museum of Art, New York City)
1652 - Battle Scene, Oil on panel, (Getty Museum, Los Angeles)
1653 - Roman Market Scene, Oil on canvas, (Royal Museums of Fine Arts, Belgium)
1660s - Deer Hunt, Oil on canvas, (Hermitage Museum, Saint Petersburg)
1660 - The Piazza del Popolo, Rome, Oil on canvas, (Minneapolis Institute of Arts, Minneapolis)
1664 - Peasants loading a Hay Cart, Oil on canvas, (National Gallery, London)
1671 - Battle Scene, Oil on canvas, (Metropolitan Museum of Art, New York City)
1674 - Flemish Town Sieged by the Spanish Soldiers, Oil on canvas, (Hermitage Museum, Saint Petersburg)
 Imaginary Harbor, oil on canvas, John and Mable Ringling Museum of Art, Sarasota, Florida
  17th Century Mediterranean Harbor Scene'', Städel Art Museum Frankfurt, Germany

References

External links

 Works and literature at PubHist

1622 births
1674 deaths
Dutch Golden Age painters
Dutch male painters
History painters
Painters from Amsterdam